Bocoyna  is a town and seat of the municipality of Bocoyna, in Chihuahua state of northern Mexico. As of 2010, the town of Bocoyna had a population of 796, up from 735 as of 2005. 

Bocoyna is located on the route of the Ferrocarril Chihuahua al Pacífico Railroad

References

Populated places in Chihuahua (state)